Arthur Vogel may refer to:

 Arthur Vogel (chemist) (1905–1966), British chemist
 Arthur Vogel (photographer) (1868–1962), German merchant, photographer and publisher
 Arthur A. Vogel (1924–2012), bishop